The Ismaili Centres are symbolic markers of the permanent presence of the Nizari Ismailis in the countries and regions in which they are established, characterised by the Aga Khan IV as 'ambassadorial buildings'. Each building is architecturally unique and functions as a jamatkhana (place of worship), but also incorporates spaces for social and cultural gatherings, intellectual engagement and reflection, as well as spiritual contemplation. They facilitate mutual exchange and seek to foster understanding between diverse peoples, communities and faiths. Collectively and individually, the Centres represent the Nizari Ismaili community’s intellectual and spiritual understanding of Islam, as well as the community’s social conscience, outlook and attitude towards the societies in which it lives.

Nizari Ismaili Centres around the world 
Ismaili Centres have been established in London (1985), Vancouver (1985), Lisbon (1998), Dubai (2008), Dushanbe (2009), and Toronto (2014). Additional Ismaili Centres have been announced for Houston, Paris and Los Angeles.

References

External links 

 Official site of the Ismaili Centres
 The Ismaili Centre, Dubai - Press release, photos and video relating to the opening
 The Ismaili Centre, Toronto - an article about the project, including renderings

 
Nizari Ismailism